Ephphatha Church, also known as Faith Tabernacle, is a historic Episcopal church at 220 W. Geer Street in Durham, Durham County, North Carolina. It was built in 1930, and is a small, one-story, six-bay deep, Gothic Revival style brick building.  It is one of only four churches in the United States built exclusively for a deaf congregation. The Episcopal Diocese of North Carolina rented the Ephphatha Church building to another congregation from 1977 until early 1981, then sold the building.

It was added to the National Register of Historic Places in 1985.

References

Deaf culture in the United States
Episcopal church buildings in North Carolina
Churches in Durham, North Carolina
Churches on the National Register of Historic Places in North Carolina
Gothic Revival church buildings in North Carolina
Churches completed in 1930
National Register of Historic Places in Durham County, North Carolina